Rasipalayam is a suburb in Coimbatore of panchayat under Sulur town in Coimbatore district in the Indian state of Tamil Nadu.

Rasipalayam is a panchayat which consists of two villages called Rasipalayam, Arugampalayam
both villages under this panchayat controlled by the Sulur Taluka in Coimbatore District with more than 6000 peoples.
In Rasipalayam there is a Government school up to 10th Standard.

Temples
 Sidhi Vinayagar
 Karana Perumal
 Athanur Amman
 Angala Amman
 arunachaleswarar thirukoil
 lakshmi narayana perumal thirukoil
 Thangamman Kovil
 Viramathi Amman Kovil
 Kamatchi Amman Kovil.
 Mahali Amman Kovil.
 Pommu Karuvanrayar Koil
 Vaaikaal vinayagar temple

References

Villages in Coimbatore district